Lantigua is a surname. Notable people with the surname include:

Enrique Lantigua (1910–1985), Dominican baseball player
John Lantigua (born 1947), American journalist and crime novelist
William Lantigua (born 1955), American politician